The 2D Or Not 2D Animation Festival (2dornot2d), is an animated film festival held annually in Seattle, Washington, and devoted to international animation cinema. The Pacific Science Center hosts the event in its IMAX theater which resides on the campus of Seattle Center.

Background
The parent organization of 2dornot2d is the Animaticus Foundation, a non-profit organization dedicated to the preservation, education and evolution of traditional 2D animation. The foundation acts to allow survival of 2D animation through education and high level production, and through allowing future animators opportunities to study and gain experience through apprenticeships to established master animators.

Festivals

Past Festivals

2009
On 5 December 2009, the fourth annual 2D Or Not 2D was held in the Eames Imax Theater at the Pacific Science Center in Seattle, Washington.

2008
On the 14th-15 November 2008, the third annual 2D Or Not 2D was held in the Boeing Imax Theater at the Pacific Science Center in Seattle, Washington.

2007
On the 2nd-3 November 2007, the second annual 2D Or Not 2D was held in the Everett Theater in Everett, Washington. Roy E. Disney was keynote speaker.

2006
On the 17th-19 November 2006, the first annual 2D Or Not 2D was held in the Everett Theater in Everett, Washington.

References

External links

2D Or Not 2D Animation Festival Pacific Science Center
Animaticus Foundation
ASIFA Seattle

Further reading
"Festival Report(2006)" (Cartoon Brew)
"2d or not 2d: Is that a question?(2006)" (Mad Cartoonist)
"2d or not 2d Animation Festival: Michel Gagne(2007)" (Vancouver Animated News)
"Annual Animation Festival(2009)" (DigiPen)
"2D or not 2D Animation Festival - Seattle 2008" (Scuzzpopper)

Animation film festivals in the United States
Culture of Seattle
Festivals in Seattle
Film festivals in Washington (state)
Film organizations in the United States
Film festivals established in 2006
Recurring events